Red Cross War Memorial Children's Hospital in Cape Town, South Africa was opened in 1956 through public subscription as a memorial to soldiers lost in the Second World War. The suggestion that the memorial take the form of a children's hospital was proposed by Vyvyan U.T. Watson.  Mr Watson, a prominent businessman, had lost his first born and only son, Peter Tennant Watson, at about four years old, to an outbreak of diphtheria in Cape Town.  Mr Watson was a major force in steering the organization of the building of the hospital.  The Peter Pan statue on the hospital grounds, sculpted by Ivan Mitford-Barberton, was donated by Mr Watson and his wife, Gwendolyn.  Mr Watson was later President of the South African Red Cross Society. It is one of two dedicated children's public hospitals in sub-Saharan Africa, and one of only a few dedicated children's hospitals in the Southern hemisphere.

The hospital has academic links to the University of Cape Town's School of Child and Adolescent Health, the University of the Western Cape Dental School and the University of Stellenbosch; it is regarded as South Africa's leading centre for post-graduate specialist paediatric medical and surgical training.

References

External links
 Official website
 The Children's Hospital Trust

Hospital buildings completed in 1956
Hospitals in Cape Town
Hospitals established in 1956
University of Cape Town
Teaching hospitals in South Africa
1956 establishments in South Africa
Children's hospitals in South Africa
20th-century architecture in South Africa